Mallikarjuna Rao may refer to:

 Grandhi Mallikarjuna Rao (born 1950), founder and chairman of GMR Group
 Kandula Mallikarjuna Rao (1921–1996), popular music composer and singer
 Mallikarjuna Rao (actor) (died 2008), popular Comedian in Telugu cinema

Hindu given names
Indian given names
Telugu names
Telugu given names
Masculine given names
Indian masculine given names